Broadcast to the World is the sixth studio album released by American punk rock band Zebrahead. The album was influenced by Lit's A Place in the Sun (1999). It is their first album with new co-vocalist/rhythm guitarist Matty Lewis, who replaced former member Justin Mauriello after he left the group in late 2004.

Shawn Harris of The Matches created the artwork for the album, and for the band's follow-up album, Phoenix.

Production
Broadcast to the World was recorded at Maple Studios in Santa Ana, California, and Noise Factory in Fullerton, California, with Cameron Webb and the band as producers. Webb and Greg Bergdorf handled the recording; additional production was done by Marshall Altman and Bergdorf. Bergdorf and Sergio Chavez performed additional editing. Webb mixed the recordings, before the album was mastered by Brian Gardner at Bernie Grundman in Hollywood, California.

Release
Zebrahead embarked on a West Coast US tour in January 2006 alongside Reel Big Fish and Goldfinger. On October 17, 2006, Broadcast to the World was made available for streaming via Alternative Press. It was released in the U.S. on October 24 through Icon. In November 2006, the band went on a tour of the US with support from Authority Zero. On March 3, 2007, a music video was released for "Karma Flavored Whisky"; the following month, they went on a tour of Europe with MxPx. In June and July 2007, the band toured the US alongside Unwritten Law, Bullets and Octane, and Neurosonic.

Critical reception

Allmusic reviewer Rick Anderson called them a heavy rock band that are "...owing far more to the old school than the new, but that adds the welcome element of solid melodic hooks to the mix." He said that the music had elements of The Clash and Rancid. He also praised its range of songs to enable the band's audience to either sing/rap along, mosh along to or yell along to.

Track listing
All songs written by Zebrahead.

Personnel
Personnel per booklet.

Zebrahead
 Greg Bergdorf – guitar
 Ali Tabatabaee – lead vocals
 Ben Osmundson – bass
 Matty Lewis – lead vocals, guitar
 Ed Udhus – drums

Additional musicians
 Jason Freese – additional instruments

Production and design
 Cameron Webb – producer, mixing, recording
 Zebrahead – producer
 Marshall Altman – additional production
 Greg Bergdorf – additional production, recording, additional editing
 Sergio Chavez – additional editing
 Brian Gardner – mastering
 Shawn Harris – artwork
 Emilee Seymour – artwork

Chart positions

Media usages 

 The song "Lobotomy for Dummies" was featured in the 2006 video game, FlatOut 2. It was also featured in the 2007 video game, MX vs. ATV Untamed.
 The songs "Wake Me Up" and "The Walking Dead" were featured in the 2006 video game, The Fast and the Furious.

Release history

References
 Citations

Sources

 

Zebrahead albums
2006 albums
Sony Music albums